Black Forest Academy (BFA) is a private, Christian, coeducational, English-speaking boarding school serving grades 5 through 12.    The school campus is located in Kandern, Germany. BFA houses students in several residence halls in Kandern and the surrounding villages.  Boarding is only allowed for high school students (grades 9-12), but students whose families live locally may attend BFA's middle school (grades 5-8).

Academics
Black Forest Academy is a Christian international college-preparatory boarding school, leading to a fully accredited US high school diploma. Students have the opportunity to take Honors and AP courses, as well as dual-enrollment courses available through BFA’s online learning program. 

BFA has a wide range of co-curricular opportunities for students including music and drama programs, athletics, service opportunities, the National Honor Society, Student Council, and Model UN. BFA’s guidance department helps students with the college planning and application process. In addition, BFA’s campus is a site for PSAT, ACT, SAT and Advanced Placement (AP) testing. BFA offers support services for students through the Discovery Program (academic support), an ELL (English Language Learner) program, and a counseling department. BFA is an international Christian school; Bible is a mandatory class all students must complete in order to pass the year and graduate.

Boarding school
Over half of BFA’s high school students come to live in dormitories during the school year. BFA's Residence Life program has several dorm houses located in and around Kandern.  In recent years, new residence halls in Kandern have been named after old, much loved dorms in the surrounding villages. As such, Palm, Sonne, Blauenhof, and Maug are now located in Kandern itself.  Storchenblick and HBR (Haus Bad Riedlingen) have not yet been relocated. Several dorms are co-ed by floor, allowing for siblings to live in the same dorm.

Arts
BFA offers education in many artistic disciplines such as Drawing, Ceramics, Industrial Arts, Graphic Design, Orchestra & Band, Choir and Drama.

Sports
BFA offers many athletic opportunities to its students, including sports such as Cross Country, Track & Field, Volleyball, Soccer, and Basketball.

Elementary partnership
BFA partners with Freie Evangelische Schule in the operation of Christliche Schule Kandern, a bilingual school for grades 1-4.

References

External links
 Black Forest Academy

Christian schools in Germany
Boarding schools in Germany
Private schools in Germany
International schools in Germany
Co-educational boarding schools
Educational institutions established in 1956
1956 establishments in West Germany